The Žužemberk Fault is a fault in Slovenia. The Upper Carniola Basin may have formed as a pull-apart basin between the dextral Žužemberk and Sava faults during the Quaternary.

References

Geology of Slovenia
Seismic faults of Europe